Cazalys Stadium is a sports stadium in Cairns, Queensland, Australia. It is situated in the suburb of Westcourt. The stadium is named after the social club which abuts the oval, Cazalys, which itself was named after Australian rules footballer Roy Cazaly.

With a capacity of approximately 13,500 people, Cazalys Stadium is the largest oval stadium in Cairns and features a main grandstand relocated from the Brisbane Cricket Ground in the late 1990s. It is used by the Queensland Cricket Association, Queensland Rugby League, and AFL Cairns. The stadium has hosted matches in the Australian Football League, National Rugby League, and A-League, as well as Test and One Day International cricket.

History
In 1957 the Australian National Football Council, through Bruce Andrew, purchased land in Cairns for the first dedicated field in regional Queensland, which became Australian Football Park. The Cairns Australian Football League, led by Kevin Crathern (then president of the CAFL), helped clear the land of trees, filled in the dense bushland, and turned the land into a suitable playing field. In 1984 the CAFL began negotiations with the ANFC in a bid to purchase the freehold of Australian Football Park. The bid would prove successful, and the CAFL made the final payment on the ground in 1994. From 1997 to 1998, $2.4 million was spent upgrading the stadium, which included acquiring the western grandstand from the Gabba and the installation of four light towers. In 1999, the CAFL purchased the adjacent 51st Battalion barracks housing property, which later became the headquarters for AFL Cairns, and renamed the ground to Cazalys Stadium after the adjoining social club. In 2008, $3 million was spent upgrading the stadium including lighting to AFL television standards, new entrance gates on Till Street, increasing the size of player dressing rooms, providing adequate first aid and medical facilities and improved coaching facilities. In 2011, a $15 million stadium redevelopment was completed, which included new grandstand and players facilities, media box and upgraded lighting.

Sports

Cricket
In July and August 2003, Australia hosted Bangladesh in an out of season series in Cairns and Darwin. Cazalys Stadium hosted the 2nd Test and the first two One Day Internationals while Marrara Oval in Darwin hosted the 1st Test and 3rd ODI. Australia won all matches comfortably. In July 2004, Australia hosted Sri Lanka in a two test series with matches again in Cairns and Darwin. However, due to disappointing attendances in both series, Cairns has not hosted Australian international cricket matches since, despite the fact that, according to cricket historian Gideon Haigh, "Almost a quarter of the combined populations of Cairns and Darwin attended the cricket" during the Bangladesh Test and ODI series. In October 2008, the venue hosted a Ford Ranger Cup match between Queensland and New South Wales On 8 December 2016 Cazalys Stadium hosted a First-Class match between a Cricket Australia XI v Pakistan cricket team.

In January 2019, Cazalys Stadium hosted WBBL T20 cricket. International fixtures for the 2020-21 cricket season at Cazalys Stadium for October 2020 were announced by Cricket Australia, including T20 and ODI, hosting the West Indies cricket team and the New Zealand women's national cricket team respectively. Planned international fixtures announced for 2020 were subject to prevailing COVID-19 circumstances and the international women's matches were relocated to Allan Border Field in Albion, Queensland in Brisbane after the schedules were announced due to the prevailing circumstances and logistical issues at the time.

In July 2022, it was announced that Cazalys Stadium would make its BBL debut, with the Brisbane Heat to hold their BBL12 season opener against the Melbourne Renegades on December 15.

In September 2022, the stadium hosted New Zealand for three ODIs, the first international cricket matches in Cairns since 2004. Australia won the series 3–0.

Test centuries
, seven Test centuries have been scored in Cairns.

ODI centuries
, one ODI century has been scored in Cairns.

Test five-wicket hauls
, only two bowlers have taken five-wicket hauls at the venue - both bowlers took 10 wickets in the match.

ODI five-wicket hauls
, only one ODI five-wicket haul has been taken at the venue.

Rugby league
In 2001, the stadium hosted two National Rugby League matches, both involving the North Queensland Cowboys. Crowds of 13,000 and 6,113 attended the matches.

Australian rules football

Cazalys Stadium hosts Australian rules football matches during the winter. AFL Cairns is headquartered at Cazalys Stadium; the league's Manunda Hawks plays its home matches at the stadium, and all AFL Cairns finals are played at the stadium.

The venue hosted AFL pre-season matches each season from 2000 until 2007; and its first Australian Football League match for premiership points in 2011. The Richmond Football Club played a home-away-from-home match against the newly established Gold Coast Football Club in each of the 2011, 2012 and 2013 AFL seasons; sellout crowds of 10,382, 10,961 and 11,197 attended the three matches. The Western Bulldogs replaced Richmond in hosting the Suns in Cairns from the 2014 AFL season. In the first round the  2018 AFL season, the Gold Coast replaced the Bulldogs as the home team and hosted North Melbourne as Gold Coast's regular home ground Metricon Stadium was unavailable due to preparations for the 2018 Commonwealth Games.

In the 2020 AFL season. the Fremantle Dockers and Sydney Swans relocated temporarily to Cairns with officials and support staff for football matches played at Cazalys Stadium. From rounds 15 to 18, Cairns hosted one match per round, featuring either Sydney or Fremantle.

The 2021 AFL season fixture saw  play their round 13 home game against  at the venue, with the match replacing the Saints' annual match in Shanghai, China, which was cancelled due to the COVID-19 pandemic. St Kilda returned to Cazalys Stadium in round 7 of the 2022 season, when they  played .

Soccer
Cazalys Stadium hosted its first A-League match between Brisbane Roar and Wellington Phoenix on Saturday, 12 December 2015. Brisbane won the game 2–1.

Other events
In June 2013 the stadium hosted a Nitro Circus Live show during its 2013 Australian Regional Tour. A crowd of around 10,000 people attended the event.

Notable games
 Australia hosted the first international Test cricket match played outside of an Australian capital city against Bangladesh from 25 to 28 July 2003. Australia defeated Bangladesh by an innings and 98 runs.
 Australia hosted the 2nd Test in its series against Sri Lanka from 9–13 July 2004.  The match ended in a draw.
 AFL club Gold Coast Suns won their third AFL home and away season game on 16 July 2011, winning a tough and hard-fought game against Richmond 12.13 (85) to 9.16 (70) 
 Gold Coast Suns won its first match of the 2012 AFL home and away season on 14 July 2012, ending a twenty-one match losing streak by defeating Richmond 13.12 (90) to 13.10 (88). With 30 seconds left in the 4th quarter the Gold Coast Suns trailed by 10 points, but kicked two goals including one after the siren by rugby league convert Karmichael Hunt to win the match.

Attendance records

Last updated on 23 July 2017

Sources
 AFL Attendance Records
 NRL Attendance Records

See also
List of Test cricket grounds

References

External links

Cazaly's Cazaly's Social Club website
 

Defunct Australian Football League grounds
Rugby league stadiums in Australia
Buildings and structures in Cairns
Test cricket grounds in Australia
1957 establishments in Australia
Sports venues completed in 1957
North East Australian Football League grounds
Women's Big Bash League
Sport in Cairns
Sports venues in Queensland